Triplophysa grahami is a small species of stone loach from China. It is endemic to the Jinsha River basin in Yunnan, Southwest China. There is also a record from Lishe River, but this is believed to be a different species. It grows to  standard length. It lives in the spaces between stones and floating grasses in slow streams.

References

G
Freshwater fish of China
Endemic fauna of Yunnan
Fish described in 1906
Taxa named by Charles Tate Regan